The Shahr Ashob (literary written as Shahr-e-Ashob (lit. 'The city's misfortune' ), sometimes spelled Shahar-i-Ashob, is an ancient Urdu poetic genre in South Asia with its roots in lamented classical Urdu poetry. It was existed and widely used by the poets between the 16th and 19th centuries during the Mughal Empire. Ashob remained an historical genre in Persian, Urdu and Turkish literature used by the writers, predominantly by the Mughal poets to express their anguish and sorrows over political and social shifts.

The Ashobs are generally describing emotional thoughts of a writer in a narrative poem based on several competencies. It reads naturally or conversationally and begins as a kind of photographic depiction of a moment (such as war, invasion etc.) in anguish. It consists of five to six stanzas normally written in rhymed verse for the first four lines. The first line rhymes with the second, third and fourth, and the fifth line rhymes with none, but combines the thoughts collectively.

History 
Ashob originally came into existence in 16th century. It was first introduced in south Asia by the Mughal poets, including Masud Sa'd Salman, who started writing Ashobs during his literary career. Some ashobs were also written by Shakir Naji who served in the Army of the Mughal Empire during Muhammad Shah's reign. When the king was defeated, he covered major impacts of military conflict on the Mughal kingdom. An Indian poet Qayem Chandpuri was also engaged in writing ashobs. His writing covered civil–military relations, mainly military aid between the sixteenth Mughal ruler Shah Alam II and Maratha Empire in order to defeat Zabita Khan in 1772. Some prominent poets, including Mir Taqi Mir and Mirza Muhammad Rafi Sauda are also credited with "ashob writings". Mirza wrote a list of ashobs on Nader Shah's invasion of India, while Mir wrote on economic crisis of Delhi.

Later (around 1708–1710), ashob was merely used after the death of Aurangzeb in 1707, and since then it began disappearing until the British rule made several people flee across the Indian subcontinent to the neighboring states or countries. It is believed the ashob was popularized during the 1857 uprising in India, but later it was not used in the modern literature.

Poems written in ashobs 

In 1979, a writer named Naeem Ahmad wrote a book on Shahr Ashob's birth titled Shahr Ashob Ka Tahqiqi Mutalaah (A Brief study of the Shahr Ashob). The book, currently serving only in Urdu language, was later published by the University of California.

Books

References

Notes

Literary genres
Poetic forms
Urdu-language poetry
Laments
Persian literature
Indian poetics
Pakistani poetics